|}

The Ladbrokes Champion Chase is a Grade 1 National Hunt chase in Ireland which is open to horses aged five years or older. It is run at Down Royal over a distance of about 3 miles (4,828 metres), and during its running there are fifteen fences to be jumped. The race is scheduled to take place each year in late October or early November.

The event was established in 1999, and it was initially contested over 3 miles and 1 furlong. It was cut to its present distance in 2000, and given Grade 1 status in 2002.

The Ladbrokes Champion Chase is now the first Grade 1 event of the Irish National Hunt season. It was sponsored by JNwine.com (James Nicholson Wine Merchant) from its inception until the 2018 running. Ladbrokes took over the sponsorship in 2019.

Records
Most successful horse (2 wins):
 Beef or Salmon – 2004, 2006
 Kauto Star - 2008, 2010
 Road to Respect - 2018, 2019

Leading jockey (4 wins):
 Ruby Walsh – Taranis (2007), Kauto Star (2008, 2010), Valseur Lido (2016)

Leading trainer (5 wins):
 Paul Nicholls – Taranis (2007), Kauto Star (2008, 2010), Kauto Stone (2012), Frodon (2021)

Winners

See also
 Horse racing in Ireland
 List of Irish National Hunt races

References

 Racing Post:
 
 guardian.co.uk – "Kauto Star strides to victory in jnwine.com Champion Chase" (2008).
 pedigreequery.com – James Nicholson Wine Merchant Champion Chase – Down Royal.

National Hunt races in Ireland
National Hunt chases
Recurring events established in 1999
Down Royal Racecourse
Horse races in Northern Ireland
1999 establishments in Northern Ireland